|}

This is a list of electoral division results for the Northern Territory 1980 General Election in Australia.

Results by electoral division

Alice Springs

Arnhem 

 Preferences were not distributed.

Barkly 

 Preferences were not distributed.

Casuarina 

 Preferences were not distributed.

Elsey 

|- style="background-color:#E9E9E9"
! colspan="6" style="text-align:left;" |After distribution of preferences

 Preferences were not distributed to completion.

Fannie Bay

Gillen

Jingili 

 Preferences were not distributed.

Ludmilla 

 Preferences were not distributed.

MacDonnell

Millner

Nhulunbuy

Nightcliff 

 Preferences were not distributed.

Port Darwin 

 Preferences were not distributed.

Sanderson

Stuart

Stuart Park 

 Preferences were not distributed.

Tiwi 

 Preferences were not distributed.

Victoria River 

 Preferences were not distributed.

See also 

 1980 Northern Territory general election
 Members of the Northern Territory Legislative Assembly, 1980–1983

References 

Results of Northern Territory elections